Saku-Pekka Sahlgren (born 8 April 1992) is a Finnish former footballer who played as a goalkeeper.

He signed a two-year contract with Sandnes Ulf in January 2016. He retired after the 2021 season.

References

External links

Profile at hjk.fi 
Profile at veikkausliiga.com 

1992 births
Living people
Association football goalkeepers
Finnish footballers
Finland under-21 international footballers
Kokkolan Palloveikot players
Helsingin Jalkapalloklubi players
Klubi 04 players
Rovaniemen Palloseura players
Kotkan Työväen Palloilijat players
Veikkausliiga players
Sandnes Ulf players
Kongsvinger IL Toppfotball players
Norwegian First Division players
Finnish expatriate footballers
Expatriate footballers in Norway
Finnish expatriate sportspeople in Norway